Le Quotidien d'Oran is a daily French-language Algerian newspaper, headquartered in Oran, Algeria.

It was established on 14 December 1994.

The editor is Kamel Daoud. The column "Raïna Raïkoum" ("My Opinion, Your Opinion") is written by Daoud.

References

External links
  Le Quotidien d'Oran

1994 establishments in Algeria
French-language newspapers published in Algeria
Mass media in Oran
Publications established in 1994